Youn's Stay is a South Korean reality show which premiered on tvN on January 8, 2021 and airs every Friday at 21:10 (KST).

Overview
The show is a rebrand from Youn's Kitchen, in which the cast members operate a hanok guesthouse, specially for foreigners who have lived in South Korea for less than a year.

Cast
 Youn Yuh-jung
 Lee Seo-jin
 Jung Yu-mi
 Park Seo-joon
 Choi Woo-shik

Viewership

References

External links
  

2021 South Korean television series debuts
TVN (South Korean TV channel) original programming
South Korean reality television series
Korean-language television shows